Ernest Rides Again is a 1993 American comedy film written and directed by John Cherry and starring Jim Varney. The sixth film to feature the character Ernest P. Worrell, the fifth in the Ernest series and the last in the series to be theatrically released. The plot follows Ernest and a history professor as they discover a long-lost Revolutionary War cannon and must protect it from others who want the precious jewels hidden inside.

Plot synopsis

Lovable know-it-all knucklehead Ernest P. Worrell, who is working as a janitor at a local college, discovers an antique metal plate near a construction site. Ernest shows it to Dr. Melon, a university professor who believes that it came from a giant Revolutionary War cannon called "Goliath" (named after the legendary biblical giant). Dr. Melon had previously been ridiculed by his peers for theorizing that the real Crown Jewels of England were stolen during the Revolutionary War and were actually hidden inside the long-lost cannon.

They begin to search for the artifact near the construction site and eventually locate it inside an abandoned mine. They are ambushed by historical antiquity collector and Dr. Melon's colleague Dr. Glencliff whom they then lead on a harrowing chase through the countryside. Things become more complicated for them when British authorities hear about the incident and send a team of secret agents after them to retrieve the jewels. Dr. Melon's wife, Nan, on the other hand is only after him and Ernest for the jewels. While everyone is hot on their trail, Ernest develops a deep friendship with Dr. Melon. After crashing the cannon into a forest, Ernest locates the jewels, not in its barrel as the legend describes but in the gunpowder kegs. After putting the crown on his head, he finds himself unable to get it off. Dr. Glencliff shows up, abducts him, and takes him to his clinic in an attempt to surgically remove it and kill him at the same time. Dr. Melon meets up with Nan and convinces her that Ernest changed his life.

While at the clinic, Ernest manages to escape from the surgery room and lead Dr. Glencliff on a chase through the building. When he has nowhere else to hide, he and Dr. Glencliff have one last fight to get the crown before Dr. Melon arrives. At the last minute, Dr. Glencliff takes an axe off of the wall and attempts to behead Ernest. Just as he is moments away from death, Dr. Melon bursts through the door and hits Dr. Glencliff over the head with the same antique metal plate Ernest found, knocking him out. Ernest realizes that Dr. Melon has saved his life and they both realize that they have gone from being acquaintances to friends. At the same time, British authorities arrive and explain to Ernest that the crown must be taken back to its rightful home. He explains that it will not come off his head and the authorities declare that whoever wears it is King of England. Dr. Melon removes it for him by tricking him about what is on his shirt, flicking him in the face. It causes it to fall off his head.

Cast

 Jim Varney as Ernest P. Worrell / Auntie Nelda
 Ron James as Dr. Abner Melon (as Ron K. James)
 Tom Butler as Dr. Glencliff
 Linda Kash as Nan Melon
 Duke  Ernsberger as Frank
 Jeff Pillars as Joe
 Russell Roberts as Suits Commander
 Dave "Squatch" Ward as Construction Worker #1
 Dee Jay Jackson as Construction Worker #2
 Alf Humphreys as Surgeon
 Frank C. Turner as Van Driver
 Alek Diakun as Librarian

Reception

Box office
Ernest Rides Again was released on November 12, 1993 in the United States. 

In its opening weekend, the film debuted at #16 at the box office, grossing $905,000 from 1,190 theaters. It grossed $1,433,496 in total, which was the lowest gross of the Ernest films and was consequently the last to be released theatrically.  All future films would be released direct-to-video.<ref
 name="AFI"></ref>

Home media

References

External links 

1993 films
1993 comedy films
Ernest P. Worrell films
American comedy films
Films directed by John R. Cherry III
1990s English-language films
1990s American films